Bradley William Beven  (born 18 September 1969) is a retired triathlete from Mirriwinni, Cairns Region, Queensland Australia.

Hall of Fame
In 2009 Beven was inducted into the Queensland Sport Hall of Fame.

Personal life
Brad Bevan lived in Mirriwini. He attended St Augustines College in Cairns. He still holds numerous records at the college.

References

External links 
Triathlon Profile

1969 births
Living people
Australian male triathletes
Recipients of the Medal of the Order of Australia
Sportspeople from Cairns
20th-century Australian people